Martin City may refer to the following places in the United States:

 Martin City, Kansas City, neighborhood of Kansas City, Missouri
 Martin City, Montana, census-designated place (CDP) in Flathead County, Montana

See also
 Martin (disambiguation)